Macrothrix is a genus of Macrothricidae.

The genus was described in 1843 by William Baird.

The genus has cosmopolitan distribution.

Species include:
 Macrothrix acutirostris (Schmarda, 1854)
 Macrothrix agsensis Dumont, Silva Briano & Subhash Babu, 2002
 Macrothrix laticornis (Jurine, 1820)

References

Cladocera